Ryoji Moriyama (森山 良二, born July 20, 1963 in Kitakyushu, Fukuoka, Japan) is a former Nippon Professional Baseball pitcher, and current the third squad manager for the Fukuoka SoftBank Hawks of Nippon Professional Baseball (NPB).

He previously played for the Seibu Lions, and the Yokohama BayStars.

Professional career

Active player era
On November 20, 1986, Moriyama was drafted  first round pick by theSeibu Lions in the  1986 Nippon Professional Baseball draft.

He made his debut in the Pacific League during the 1987 season, pitched in 4 games.

In the 1988 season, he won 10 games as a starting pitcher and honored for the 1988 Pacific League Rookie of the Year Award.

He was traded to the Yokohama BayStars in March before the start of the 1993 season, his seventh career season.

He played three seasons with the BayStars and retired after the 2005 season.

In his 9-season career, Moriyama pitched in 86 games, posting a 14-15 win–loss record, and a 4.21 ERA.

After retirement
After his retirement, Moriyama was the pitching coach for the Yokohama Bay Stars during the 1996-1997 season.

He served as the Seibu Lions' first squad and second squad pitching coach from the 1998-2007 seasons.

He also served as manager of the Fukuoka Red Warblers of the Independent League during the 2008-2009 season.

In the 2010 season, he was named first squad pitching coach for the Tohoku Rakuten Golden Eagles and served through the 2019 season.

In the 2020 season, Moriyama became the first squad pitching coach of the Fukuoka SoftBank Hawks.

He will be the third squad manager starting in the 2023 season.

References

External links

 - Career statistics - NPB.jp 
 92 Ryoji Moriyama PLAYERS2022 - Fukuoka SoftBank Hawks Official site

1963 births
Living people
Baseball people from Kitakyushu
Japanese baseball players
Nippon Professional Baseball pitchers
Seibu Lions players
Yokohama BayStars players
Nippon Professional Baseball Rookie of the Year Award winners
Japanese baseball coaches
Nippon Professional Baseball coaches